Magal is a 2007 Indian Tamil-language morning soap opera that aired Monday through Friday on Sun TV from 8 October 2007 to 14 October 2011 for 1015 episodes. It was highly praised in TRP ratings of Tamil serials. This show starred Meenakumari, Chandra Lakshman, Sulakshana, Kamalesh, Varalakshmi and Rishi among others. It was produced by Akash Khurana of Nimbus Television and directed by Francis Bapu. It also aired in Sri Lanka on the Tamil channel Vasantham TV.

Plot

This story revolves around a young woman named Kaveri (Meenakumari) and her family. She had finished college and went to work in a nursing home as a Nurse. Her family was impoverished. She has a father, mother, three sisters and one brother. Brother and father were indolent. She helped run the family. One big sister Padma (Yokini) worked in the shop, while sisters Priya (Kaviya) and Revathy (Dhanalakshmi) studied in college.

Kaveri loved and married Karthick (Rishikesh). But Eashwari (Varalakshmi), daughter of Naggapan (Ramy Reddy), also loved Karthick and took revenge on both Karthick and Kaveri. Radhidevi breaks the family into more problems. Kaveri faces the issues and starts a business with her husband.

This series took various types of stories in episodes between (500- till the end) with more important characters. Later, Shakthi (Chandra Lakshman) who was a strong woman, helps Kaveri take revenge on Easwari. In the last episode, Karthick killed Eashwari's father and went to jail. After that, Ravi (Karthick's brother and Shakthi's husband) is killed by Eashwari; then Shakthi took the gun and shot and killed Eashwari. Shakthi went to jail and showed in the last episode, after eight years, they both came out from prison and their children's born and their ages of 10 years and they returned to their work.

This series shows that women are very strong Magal (Daughter). It had been praised high in TRP ratings of Tamil serial and received high praise from viewers.

Cast

Main cast

 Meenakumari as Kaveri Saravanan
 Chandra Lakshman as Shakthi Ram
Rishi keshavan as Saravanan
 Sulakshana as Savitri (Died in the serial Episode of 568)
Abhilash as Arun
Kavya as Priya
Revathy Priya as Anitha Srinivasan 
 Dhanalakshmi as Revathy
 Kamalesh as Shanmugam
Hemalatha as Janani
 Varalakshmi as Eshwari 
Snekha Eshwar as Lakshmi Priya
Aravind Katharae as Aravindh
Shridhar as Srinivasan

Others 
 Rami Reddy as Nagappan (Eashwari's brother, died in the serial) 
 J. Lalitha as Amman
 Vatsala Rajagopal as Rajeshwari 
Vanaja as Gayatri
Jayalakshmi.B as Sweety
 Shwetha Bandekar as Swapna
Priya as Madhavi
 Shwetha as Swarubini
 Murali as Raj Kumar
Sri Lekha as Paramaeshwari
 Kovai Papu as Padmanabhan
Kowsalya Sendhamarai as Radha 
Yokini as Padma
Revathy Priya as Anitha
Swetha 
Suhashini as Deepika 
Vijay Krishunaraj
 Sai Prashanth as Raam(Shakthi's Love interest)
Banu Prakash 
Nesan
Bindhu Madhavi
Senthilnathan
Vatsala Rajagopal
Rajashree
C.N. Ravishankaran
Haripriya
Arun Prakash
Vislani
Muralidharan
S.P.Senthilvelan
Rathna Kumar
Sumangali
Maleeswari
Jay
Amirthakadesan
Bhagathavastsala
Sundari
Vasanth
Kalyan
B. Lenin
Deepika
Ashiq
Vijiketi
Murali
Yek Raj
R. Sindhu
Kothai Naachiyar
Balaji
Rajkumar Manoharan
Sendhil
Selva Kumar
Kumaresan
Udumalai Ravi

Title track
The title track of this series was sung by Srinivas. The music for this title track was composed by Rajhesh Vaidhya while the background music score was done by Jai Kishan.

See also
 List of TV shows aired on Sun TV (India)

References

External links
 Official Website 
 Sun TV on YouTube
 Sun TV Network 
 Sun Group 

Sun TV original programming
2007 Tamil-language television series debuts
Tamil-language television shows
2011 Tamil-language television series endings